Al Ulayyan are the family which ruled Buraidah, the capital of Qassim, and part of Qassim region in specific times for more than 300 years.

References

Arab dynasties
Middle Eastern royal families